Mohammed Amanullah (16 March 1939 – 11 March 2021) was a Bangladesh Awami League politician and former Member of Parliament from Mymensingh-11.

Early life
Amanullah was born on 16 March 1939. He went to medical school and completed a M.B.B.S. degree.

Career
Amanullah was elected to Parliament from Mymensingh-11 as a candidate of Bangladesh Awami League.

Death 
Amanullah died on 11 March 2021.

References 

1939 births
2021 deaths
People from Bhaluka Upazila
Awami League politicians
7th Jatiya Sangsad members
8th Jatiya Sangsad members
9th Jatiya Sangsad members
10th Jatiya Sangsad members